Marion Kim Mangrobang (born September 4, 1991) is a Filipino professional triathlete.  Mangrobang is a gold medalist in the Southeast Asian Games women's and mixed relay triathlon events.

Early life 
As early as nine years old, she has shown interest in sports and was encouraged by her parents. In 2000, she took swimming lessons. Competing in a variety of sports events—from weekly fun runs to both local and international competitions—Mangrobang pursued competitive training in 2014, supported by her Portuguese coach, Sergio Santos.

Education 
Mangrobang attended the Dominican College of Sta. Rosa, Laguna.

Triathlon career
Mangrobang won her third gold medal at the 30th Southeast Asian (SEA) Games women's triathlon at the Subic Bay Boardwalk in Zambales.

References 

Filipino sportspeople
Triathletes at the 2018 Asian Games
1991 births
Living people
Southeast Asian Games gold medalists for the Philippines
Filipino female triathletes
Asian Games competitors for the Philippines
Filipino female swimmers
People from Santa Rosa, Laguna
Southeast Asian Games silver medalists for the Philippines
Triathletes at the 2014 Asian Games
Competitors at the 2015 Southeast Asian Games
Competitors at the 2017 Southeast Asian Games
Competitors at the 2019 Southeast Asian Games
Southeast Asian Games medalists in triathlon
Competitors at the 2021 Southeast Asian Games